Murray Lerner (May 8, 1927 – September 2, 2017) was an American documentary and experimental film director and producer.

Career
Lerner was born May 8, 1927, in Philadelphia, Pennsylvania to Nacham and Goldie (Levine) Lerner. Murray's father left the family shortly after his birth. He was raised by his mother in Brooklyn, New York, where he graduated from high school.

Lerner attended Harvard University on a full scholarship. He helped start a film production society at Harvard and began teaching himself the art of filmmaking. Lerner graduated from Harvard in 1947 with a degree in Poetry. His first feature-length film, released in 1956, was the underwater documentary Secrets of the Reef which he co-directed with Lloyd Ritter and Robert M. Young.

The filmmaker's break-through was the 1967 documentary Festival! which featured highlights from the Newport Folk Festival in 1963 through 1966. The film, nominated for an Oscar in 1968, captured performances by folk and blues icons such as Bob Dylan, Joan Baez, Donovan, Peter, Paul & Mary, Howlin' Wolf, Mississippi John Hurt, and Son House.

Lerner filmed the Isle of Wight Festival 1970 in England in its entirety. with seven crews. After the promoters declared bankruptcy, Lerner fought a four-year battle in the British courts, eventually winning the rights to his footage.

From the 1990s through his death, Lerner used the footage to produce a series of documentaries centered on the festival, including Message to Love: The Isle of Wight Festival (1995) and separate films on performances by Jimi Hendrix (1991), The Who (1996), Miles Davis (2004), Jethro Tull (2005), Emerson, Lake & Palmer (2006), Bob Dylan (2007), The Moody Blues (2008), Leonard Cohen (2009), Rory Gallagher's band Taste (2015), The Doors (2018), and Joni Mitchell (2018).

Perhaps the most significant of Lerner's works is the 1979 documentary From Mao to Mozart: Isaac Stern in China, which won the Academy Award for Best Documentary the next year. The film was preserved by the Academy Film Archive in 2000.

Death
Lerner died of kidney failure on September 2, 2017, at his home in Long Island City, Queens, New York. He was survived by his wife of 60 years, the former Judith Levine, his son Noah and two grandchildren.

Selected filmography
Secrets of the Reef (1956)
Festival (1967) 
From Mao to Mozart: Isaac Stern in China (1980) 
 Magic Journeys (1982) 
Message to Love: The Isle of Wight Festival (1995) 
Listening To You: The Who At The Isle Of Wight Festival (1996)
Blue Wild Angel: Jimi Hendrix at the Isle of Wight (2002)
Miles Electric: A Different Kind of Blue (2004)
Nothing is Easy: Jethro Tull at the Isle of Wight (2005)
Emerson, Lake & Palmer (The Birth Of A Band: Isle of Wight 1970) (2006)
Amazing Journey: The Story of The Who (2007)
The Other Side of the Mirror: Bob Dylan at the Newport Folk Festival  (2007) 
The Moody Blues (Threshold of a Dream: Live at the Isle of Wight Festival 1970) (2008)
Leonard Cohen (Leonard Cohen Live at The Isle of Wight 1970) (2009)
Taste (What's Going On Live At The Isle of Wight 1970) (2015)
The Doors: Live at the Isle of Wight Festival 1970 (2018)
 Joni Mitchell: Both Sides Now. Live at the Isle of Wight Festival 1970 (2018)

External links

Interview with Murray Lerner (2008) about "Festival" and "The Other Side of the Mirror"
Interview with Murray Lerner (2009) about "Leonard Cohen: Live At The Isle of Wight 1970"

References

1927 births
2017 deaths
American film directors
Directors of Best Documentary Feature Academy Award winners
American documentary filmmakers
20th-century American Jews
Bob Dylan
21st-century American Jews
Deaths from kidney failure
Harvard University alumni
People from Philadelphia